Adolf Mahr (7 May 1887 – 27 May 1951) was an Austrian archaeologist, who served as director of the National Museum of Ireland in Dublin in the 1930s, and is credited with advancing the work of the museum substantially. Through his leadership of the Dublin Nazi chapter, and later broadcasting propaganda from Germany, he became a highly controversial figure in twentieth-century Irish history, and was not allowed to return to his job after the Second World War.

Life

Early life
Mahr was born in May 1887 in Trent in the southern reaches of the Habsburg Empire. His father, Gustav Johann Mahr (1858–1930), and grandfather, Franz Anton Mahr (1830–1891), were military bandmasters and well-known composers. His mother, Maria Antonia Schroll, like his father, was a German from the Sudetenland.  Mahr was brought up as a Roman Catholic, later becoming an atheist, and later still (at least nominally) Protestant.

Early career and university
Mahr served in the Austrian Army in 1906, attaining the rank of lieutenant, and then studied geography and prehistory at the University of Vienna, where he also sustained a long-term arm injury while duelling.

Professional career
Mahr went to work for a museum in Linz, Austria's third city, and then the Natural History and Prehistoric Museum of Vienna, where he rose to the ranks of curator and deputy director of a section. His excavation work included early exploration of the salt mine and Iron Age Celtic cemetery at Hallstatt. Mahr arrived in Ireland in 1927 to work as Senior Keeper of (Irish) Antiquities in the National Museum of Ireland in Dublin, succeeding Walther Bremer.  Mahr implemented the recommendations of Professor Nils Lithberg on reorganisation of the collections, and otherwise worked to bring order to the museum's holdings.  One of his key achievements was the production of a card index of excavations and finds, and he also drove a return to active archaeological dig work, after an interval of decades.

In 1934 Éamon de Valera appointed Mahr as the director of the museum, for which he built an international reputation through creativity and dedication.  de Valera was so impressed with his commitment that he wrote him a personal cheque for one excavation project, in Drimnagh, Dublin, for what was then a considerable sum.

During a stay for an archaeology congress in Berlin and family visit to Austria, on 1 September 1939, he was kept by Nazi Germany ("Heim ins Reich") (the ship did not leave the harbour) due to the outbreak of the war, and could not return to his directorship, from which he took a leave of absence.  At the time, he still expected to be back in Dublin by early 1940.

Nazi activities
As the Nazi Party rose to power in Germany in the 1930s, Mahr joined in 1933 and became the Local Group Leader (Ortsgruppenleiter) of the official Nazi Party in Ireland – the Auslandsorganisation (NSDAP-AO). During his time as Nazi leader he recruited roughly 23 Germans.

Later, Mahr was arrested and accused of being a Nazi spy, with a claim that he used his position as Director of the National Museum to plan Hitler's invasion of Ireland.  No formal charges were brought. After his release, Mahr tried to return to his director’s position in Ireland, but was not allowed to do so.

Late life
Mahr sought to return to his directorship, and the Taoiseach was originally in favour, given his achievements, but there was opposition from Ireland's Head of Military Intelligence, and a vocal TD.  In the end, Mahr was left in Germany, but given some pension, and derived some income from occasional lectures.  He died of heart failure in Bonn while preparing for a new job, on 27 May 1951.

Family
In 1921 Mahr married Maria van Bemmelen (1901–1975), daughter of the Dutch university professor and zoologist .  They had four children, two born in Ireland; all were raised in Dublin in the 1930s, but they were stranded in Germany or German-occupied Austria in September 1939 and were unable to travel back to Ireland, eventually settling down in post-war (West) Germany.  His marriage deteriorated from 1941. One daughter (Ingrid) later moved back to Ireland for a time. The eldest daughter, Hilde, is the subject of Chapter 7, "Hilde’s Journey 1945", in Mullins' book. It describes how the 18-year old girl, in the attempt to re-unite her parents, "comes through a defeated Germany, a land in ruins, to safety".

See also
Fritz Brase, leader of the Irish Army School of Music

References

Further reading
 
 Gerry Mullins: “The Mahrs of Dublin”. Radio documentary. Podcast by RTÉ.

Austrian archaeologists
Members of the Royal Irish Academy
Austrian Nazis
People associated with the National Museum of Ireland
1887 births
1951 deaths
20th-century archaeologists